Sambasiva Rao or Sambashiva Rao (సాంబశివరావు) is an Indian given name:

 Rayapati Sambasiva Rao, Indian politician and industrialist. 
 Kavuri Samba Siva Rao, an Indian politician, engineer and industrialist.
 A. S. Rao or Ayyagari Sambasiva Rao, was an Indian scientist.
 Avula Sambasiva Rao, was an Indian judge.
 S. Rao Kosaraju or Sambasiva Rao Kosaraju is a professor of computer science at Johns Hopkins University,

Indian given names
Telugu names